Sentinel cells refer to cells in the body's first line of defense, which embed themselves in tissues such as skin.
Sentinel cells can refer to specific antigen-presenting cells, such as:
Macrophages
Kupffer cells - in the liver
Langerhans cells - in the skin and mucosa (*these are a form of dendritic cells)
Alveolar macrophages - in the lungs
Microglia - in the brain
Dendritic cells
Sentinel cells can also refer to cells that are normally not specialized antigen-presenting cells such as:
Mast cells
Specialized T cells
Sometimes tissue cells not part of the immune system such as are also referred to as Sentinel cells:
Fibroblasts
Epithelial cells

References

Mononuclear phagocytes
Human cells
Immunology